Drásov is a municipality and village in Příbram District in the Central Bohemian Region of the Czech Republic. It has about 400 inhabitants.

Administrative parts
The village of Skalka is an administrative part of Drásov.

Geography
It lies on the border between the Benešov Uplands and Brdy Highlands. The Kocába River flows through the municipality and supplies a system of several ponds.

History
The first written mention of Drásov is from 1057.

Transport
The D4 motorway passes through the municipality.

Sights
In the municipality are no cultural monuments. The most notable building is the Chapel of Saint Wenceslaus.

References

External links

Villages in Příbram District